Aureli is a surname of Italian origin. Notable people with this surname include:

 Marc Aureli (121-180),  Roman emperor and Stoic philosopher form the Gens Aurelia
 Alessia Aureli (born 1984), Italian former ice dancer
 Andrea Aureli (born 1983), Italian actor
 Cesare Aureli (1844-1923), Italian sculptor and writer
 Emanuela Aureli (born 1973), Italian leading actress
 Giuseppe Aureli (1858-1929), Italian painter and watercolourist